Ship Creek is a small river that flows into an area of coastal swamp forest on the West Coast of New Zealand's South Island. Near the mouth of Ship Creek, there are short walks around dune lakes and ancient kahikatea swamp forest.

Toponymy
The original Māori name for the creek and the local area is Tauparikākā, which, according to local Māori, references "parrots all walking in a row".

The name Ship Creek derives from the discovery of part of the hull of a wrecked ship at this location in the 1870s. A piece of the wreck was sent to Wellington for examination. Details of the construction indicated the possibility that the timbers came from the wreck of the SS Schomberg, a clipper ship on her maiden voyage from Liverpool to Melbourne that struck an uncharted reef and was wrecked on the Shipwreck Coast on 27 December 1855. A piece of the wreck was then sent to Melbourne, and this provided further support for the identification of the timbers as coming from the wreck of the Schomberg. Over time, the build up of sand led to the wreckage being inland from the high tide mark on the shores of Ship Creek, and became covered in scrub.

Geography 

Ship Creek is at the northern end of the Haast plain that extends  to Jackson Bay / Okahu. The plain has an unusual landform, with long parallel lines of low hills with narrow swales in between. The landform results from the combined effects of sediment carried to the coast by six large rivers, longshore drift and periodic seismic uplifts. The rivers discharging into the Tasman sea in this region of coastline drain from large catchment areas in the Southern Alps, where there is high rainfall and the mountains have high rates of erosion. The suspended sediment yield of the Arawhata River has been reported as 7.18 Mt/yr, and the Haast River as 5.93 Mt/yr. The total estimated suspended sediment yield from rivers in South Westland is over 50 Mt/yr. Longshore drift leads to much of this sediment being deposited along the Haast coastline, forming dunes. The Alpine Fault runs along the inland edge of the plain, and the entire area is subject to tectonic uplift during major seismic events. Following a major uplift, existing dunes are no longer exposed to the action of the sea, and new dunes begin to form. This creates a longitudinal pattern of dunes with low-lying wetlands in between. The coastal plain is approximately 6,000 years old. The dunes close to the current shoreline have little vegetation, but the older dunes further inland are forested with tall podocarps. The swales contain wetland lakes, pakihi and kahikitea swamp forest.

Ship Creek walks
There is a car park adjacent to  that provides access to two short walks.

Dune lake walk

This  loop walk begins at an information centre beneath a shelter. A boardwalk follows along the current active sand dunes, passing through the most recent swale between dunes, and an older dune that is now forested. The forest in this area has been stunted by the action of the wind. The views from the beach to the south-west extend to Jackson Head.

Notable vegetation in the dunes includes the sedge pingao which binds sand. Flax grows at the outer limit of the areas of low scrub and forest. As the path moves inland onto longer established dunes, the plants that can be seen include toetoe, mingimingi, Coprosma rhamnoides, cabbage tree, māhoe, and Hall's totara. Ferns include hound's tongue fern and kiokio. Older and more stable dunes support taller forest where there is kamahi, karamu, southern rata, kiekie, tree fuchsia and mountain three-finger.

An observation platform provides views over Lake Mataketake in the swale between the lines of dunes. The return path passes through more mature forest on older dunes. A second observation platform allows a different view over the dune lake. There is dense forest on the rest of return path, with thick ground cover and plants at many levels, including climbing vines (scarlet rata, kiekie) and many epiphytes, including ferns and orchids.

Kahikatea swamp forest walk
This is an  loop track on a boardwalk, following Ship Creek to an area of dense coastal swamp forest with a large number of kahikatea (Dacrycarpus dacrydioides), New Zealand’s tallest tree.

Tauparikākā Marine Reserve
The Tauparikākā Marine Reserve is a small protected area, established in 2014, located immediately offshore of the mouth of Ship Creek. The reserve extends  along the shoreline, including the creek mouth, and  out from the shore.

See also
List of rivers of New Zealand

References

Westland District
Rivers of the West Coast, New Zealand
Rivers of New Zealand
Hiking and tramping tracks in the West Coast, New Zealand